Atlético Calatayud is a Spanish football team based in Calatayud in the community of Aragon. Founded in 1995, it plays in 3ª – Group 17.

Season to season

10 seasons in Tercera División
8 seasons in Categorías Regionales

External links
Official Website  
Futbolme team profile  

Calatayud
Football clubs in Aragon
Association football clubs established in 1995
1995 establishments in Spain